Zohar Zisapel (born February 15, 1949), is an Israeli entrepreneur. He co-founded the RAD Group of companies with his brother, Yehuda.

Life

Early life
Zisapel was born in Tel Aviv, one of three children of immigrant parents from Poland who owned and ran a shoe store on Herzl Street, then one of the city’s main arteries. He received public education and upon graduation from high school he enrolled as a student at the Technion – Israel Institute of Technology in Haifa. He received his B.Sc. and M.Sc. in electrical engineering from the Technion and later earned an MBA from Tel Aviv University. To help finance his education, he worked in his spare time supplying lighting to Tel Aviv discos.

Following his undergraduate education at the Technion, Zisapel completed his compulsory service in the Israel Defense Forces (IDF), after which he was hired by the Electronic Research Department of the Ministry of Defense in Tel Aviv, ultimately serving as its head. He received the Israel Defense Prize in 1979 for his work.

Family
He is the father of two children: a daughter, Klil, an accomplished artist and Hebrew writer whose books have been translated into German, Dutch and Chinese; and Michael, a physician.

Career

Founding Bynet
In the mid 1970s, Yehuda Zisapel, Zohar's elder brother, founded a small private company that marketed data communications products. The data communications products Bynet distributed in Israel in the later half of the 1970s were all manufactured abroad.

Founding RAD Data Communications
In 1981 Zohar Zisapel resigned from his position at the Ministry of Defense and, together with Yehuda, founded RAD Data Communications Ltd. Operating from small, cramped quarters in the back of Bynet’s offices, Zohar oversaw the development of RAD’s first product, a miniature modem that would revolutionize the industry. The modems that were then on the market were the size of pizza boxes. RAD’s modem, however, could fit into one’s hand, and, remarkably, it did not require an independent power source, having been designed to operate instead by utilizing power flowing over the telephone line. One version of this modem, SRM-3, would be recognized by the Guinness Book of Records as the smallest ever manufactured. Within two years of its founding, RAD had become a profitable international manufacturer of access solutions for data communications and telecommunications applications. In 1987 the company had reached $10 million in annual sales. RAD won the Israel Export Prize in 1993, the year in which its sales first exceeded $50 million. It surpassed the $100 million mark in global sales in 1996.

Creating the RAD Group
The Zisapel brothers had expanded their focus beyond miniature modems. While RAD would go on to release its first fiber optic product in 1986 and its first multiplexer one year later, the Zisapels were developing new ideas for communications products for enterprise applications -  adapters for servers and security appliances; integrated network management solutions; video conferencing infrastructure and development tools; wireless devices, and other industry niches.  But rather than follow the traditional industry paradigm by having their one existing company branch out into new areas beyond its original mandate, the Zisapels decided to found a new company that would focus on each specific industry niche they targeted. This approach grew into the RAD Group, a family of independent companies that develop, manufacture and market solutions for diverse segments of the networking and telecommunications industries.

Business philosophy and corporate values

Business philosophy
What was unique about the Zisapels' business philosophy was that each company would operate independently, without a holding company, but all of the companies would be guided by them under a collective strategic umbrella. Companies may cooperate in the development of their solutions, engage in joint marketing activities and benefit from a common management structure. This decentralized business philosophy was designed to maximize the advantages inherent in smaller business units, such as flexibility, entrepreneurial spirit and management focus. As a result, since 1984, when the RAD Group came into being, it has spawned more than 185 companies, 8 IPOs and 19 mergers and acquisitions.

Charitable work

One of Zisapel’s charitable contributions is to donate fully equipped computer rooms to educational institutions that serve children at risk and children from disadvantaged backgrounds. More than ten such projects are undertaken each year by RAD at a cost of approximately $500,000 annually. Zohar and Yehuda Zisapel have also donated $4.5 million to establish the Sara and Moshe Zisapel Nanoelectronics Center at their alma mater, the Technion, named in memory of their parents.

Awards and honors
 1994 – Israel Export Award and Entrepreneur of the Year Award
 1996 – Hugo Raminceanu Award for Economics
 1998 – Named by the Technion as a Distinguished Fellow of its Faculty of Electrical Engineering
 1998-2000 – Chairman of the Israel Association of Electronic Industries (IAEI)
 1999 – Israeli Industry Life Award
 1999-2002 – Member of the planning and budgeting committee of the Council for Higher Education in Israel
 2001 – Doctor Honoris Causa from the Technion
 2004 – Israel Communications Award
 2011 – Lifetime Achievement Award of the Israel Association of Electrical and Electronic Engineers
 2013 – Named an Honorary Colleague by the Academic College of Tel Aviv-Yafo
 2014 – Life Achievement Award of the Association of Engineers, Architects and Graduates in Technological Sciences in Israel
 On its Web site, the Technion lists Zohar Zisapel as one of its most illustrious alumni.

See also
RAD Data Communications
The RAD Group
Technion – Israel Institute of Technology
Adallom

References

External links

 VON Magazine - Front cover story, May 2007
 25 Years of RAD Group: A Conversation with Zohar Zisapel - by Mae Kowalke, TMCnet, May 22, 2006.
 Zisapel Zings Innovating Incumbents - by Light Reading, including a video interview, May 15, 2006.
 RAD Group Chairman Zohar Zisapel to Speak at VITAL Summit - by Fred Diamond, September 22, 2002
 Video Conference Now or Never? - a recorded lecture of Zohar Zisapel on Blip TV

Living people
Israeli chief executives
Israeli corporate directors
1949 births
Israel Defense Prize recipients
Israeli electrical engineers
Israeli people of Polish-Jewish descent
Israeli philanthropists